The Fall-Down Artist is a crime novel by the American writer Thomas Lipinski set in 1980s Pittsburgh, Pennsylvania.

It tells the story of Pittsburgh private detective Carroll Dorsey, whose personal life is in disarray, and who investigates a series of militant grassroots organizations dedicated to preserving the steel industry and finds violence, insurance fraud, and murder.

The novel is the first in a series of four Carroll Dorsey mysteries.

Sources
Contemporary Authors Online. The Gale Group, 2006.

External links
  Book Page @ Amazon.com

1994 American novels
American crime novels
Novels set in Pittsburgh
Fiction set in the 1980s
St. Martin's Press books